Mestre Amen Santo is an Afro-Brazilian mestre (master) of the acrobatic martial art of capoeira. He has acted in roles practicing his art in two Hollywood movies, Only The Strong and Kickboxer 4, and created much of the former's fight choreography.

He was born in Bahia, Brazil. According to himself in the interview to papoeira.com, he became interested in capoeira when he first saw it as a 6-year-old accompanying his mother to the supermarket.

"The first time I saw Capoeira I was 6 years old when I went to the supermarket called Mercado de Aguinelo, where there was a roda that Master Waldemar always made, right in front of this supermarket."

He emigrated to the United States sometime later and began teaching capoeira in Los Angeles. He is founding director of Capoeira Batuque group of capoeiristas, and currently oversees the group's schools internationally. The countries his schools are in are Japan, Dubai, Germany and the homeland of Capoeira in Brazil, Headquarters are located in Los Angeles, USA. He is also the father of three children.

External links
 Information Page at Capoeira4All
 http://capoeirabatuque.org
 http://www.papoeira.com/pt/2018/11/06/entrevista-com-mestre-amen-santo/

Capoeira mestres
Afro-Brazilian people
Living people
Year of birth missing (living people)